The 1971 Copa Simón Bolívar (English: Simon Bolivar Cup) was an international football competition organized by the Venezuelan Football Federation. The idea of this competition was to create a tournament among the champions clubs of the countries liberated by Simon Bolivar. It was played six times from its first edition in 1970 to the last in 1976, thus integrating the league champions clubs of Venezuela, Colombia, Peru, Ecuador and Bolivia. Due to its format, it was a historical precedent of the Copa Merconorte, played between the same Bolivarian countries or the Andean Community from 1998 until the 2001 edition.

This tournament began in 1971 but finished in 1973 due to internal problems at the Federación Venezolana de Fútbol (FVF). For example, the first final game was played on November 4, 1971, between Deportivo Galicia and Atlético Nacional de Medellín, but some days later the FVF didn't allow the Venezolan team to travel for the second game, so it was suspended until 1972, when the FVF authorized to Deportivo Galicia to travel to Medellín. FVF were suspended by FIFA on March 9, 1973. Finally, Venezolan doctor René 
Hemmer traveled to Colombia to join with Colombian members of Federación Colombia de Fútbol (FCF) about finishing the tournament. Nacional de Medellín and FCF agreed to play after FVF paid $5.500 due to damage because of not playing the game at the time. The extra game was played on June 9, 1973. Deportivo Galicia won the competition defeating Atlético Nacional 3–2 in the penalty kicks.

Teams

Semifinals

Venezuela

First leg

Second leg

Colombia

First leg

Second leg

Finals

First leg

Second leg

Final playoff

See also
International club competition records
Copa Merconorte
Copa Mercosur
Torneio Mercosul
CONMEBOL Cup

References

Football competitions in Venezuela
1973 in association football